Tenmile River station (formerly State School station) is a commuter rail stop on the Metro-North Railroad's Harlem Line, located in Amenia, New York. 

The station is located on Sinpatch Road (Dutchess CR 5), next to the crossing of the creek, a short distance east of NY 22/343. Tenmile River is named for the waterway of the same name adjacent to the station as well as north of the grade crossing with Sinpatch Road, and is in nearly the same spot as the State School station (named for a nearby institution for the developmentally disabled, now Taconic Developmental Center) which was closed with Penn Central's abandonment of passenger service north of Dover Plains in 1972.

History
The station was re-opened with the Wassaic train station on July 9, 2000. North of Dover Plains was Penn Central territory in 1972 and was mainly used for freight. After departing Dover, the train would cross the State School station (an area formerly known as "Weebutook") and not far after that, arrive at a small shelter with the sign reading "State School" at Mile Post 78.90. In addition to the few passengers that came to visit the New York State-operated juvenile developmental disability center, the major amount of railroad traffic was involved the shipments of soft coal on a regular basis. On any average day numerous carloads were moved in and empties switched out. Similar to the renaming of the State Facility at Wingdale, reflecting the vogue of the era, the State School was renamed the "Wassaic Developmental Center" in the late 1970s.

Station layout
The station has one two-car-long high-level side platform to the east of the track. Unusually, the MTA has placed identifying signage on concrete pilings opposite the platform to complement the signs on the platform itself.

References

External links

Rail Nice Views in Dutchess County (1999) and Extending The Harlem Line (2000)
 Station from Sinpatch Road entrance from Google Maps Street View

Metro-North Railroad stations in New York (state)
Former New York Central Railroad stations
Amenia, New York
Railway stations in Dutchess County, New York
Transportation in Dutchess County, New York
Railway stations in the United States opened in 2000